Koskenkorvan Urheilijat (Finnish for "Koskenkorva Athletes", sometimes referred to as Koskenkorva) is a Finnish professional pesäpallo team based in Ilmajoki and playing in the top-tier Finnish Superpesis. Koskenkorvan Urheilijat has participated in many sports in Finland over the years, such as athletics. Since 1985, the club's main successes have been in pesäpallo.

Koskenkorvan Urheilijat has won the men's Finnish Pesäpallo bronze medal, (Superpesis) two times, 2003 and in 2007. Koskenkorvan Urheilijat's home ground is the Sähkökoje Areena.

Achievements 

Men's Pesäpallo

Superpesis

Finnish Cup

Silver - 1989

Team

References

Pesäpallo
Sports teams in Finland